The Muckleshoot are a Lushootseed-speaking Native American tribe, part of the Coast Salish peoples of the Pacific Northwest. They are descendants of the Duwamish and Puyallup peoples whose traditional territory was located along the Green and White rivers, including up to the headwaters in the foothills of the Cascade Mountains, in present-day Washington State. Since the mid-19th century, their reservation is located in the area of Auburn, Washington, about 15 miles (24 km) northeast of the port of Tacoma and 35 miles (55 km) southeast of Seattle, another major port.

The federally recognized Muckleshoot Indian Tribe is a group that formed post-Treaty, made up of related peoples who shared territory and later a reservation near Auburn. They organized a government in 1936; the tribe is composed of intermarried descendants of various tribal groups who inhabited Central Puget Sound and occupied the Green and White rivers' watershed, from the rivers' confluence in present-day Auburn to their headwaters in the Cascades. These include the following: 

 Buklshuhls (later known as Muckleshoot) (buklshuhls - "from a high point from which you can see," which probably referred to a lookout site between the White and Green rivers) - they lived along the White River, from present-day Kent eastwards to the mountains and eventually to the Green River
 Duwamish - this people formed two bands before the mid-1850s 
 Dxʷ'Dəw?Abš / Dkhw'Duw'Absh ("People of the Inside (the environs of Elliott Bay)", also known as doo-AHBSH - "People of the Doo, i.e. Inside")
 Xacuabš ("People of the Large Lake (Lake Washington)," also known as hah-choo-AHBSH - "people of HAH-choo," meaning 'a large lake', referring to what is known today as Lake Washington)
 Snoqualmie (S·dukʷalbixʷ / Sduqwalbixw) - they lived along the Tolt River and the Snoqualmie River)
 Upper Pyallup (River) people: Puyallup (Spuyaləpabš or S’Puyalupubsh) bands along the Upper Puyallup River 
 White River Valley tribes: 
 Stkamish / Skekomish (Steq-ABSH) ("People of the log jam," named after the village Steq ("log jam") on the White (now Green) River in the Kent vicinity, the people of Steq were the Steq-ABSH; Settlers and government officials anglicized "Steq-ABSH" into Stkamish and applied the term to all villages between Auburn and Renton Junction, also known as White River Indians)
 Smulkamish / Smalhkamish ("People of White River," named after the term that referred to the former course of the Upper White River) - They lived in villages on the present Muckleshoot Indian Reservation and near present-day Enumclaw)
 Skopamish (Skop-ABSH / Skwohp-AHBSH) ("The People of the variable stream" or "Green ('fluctuating') River People." They were also known as the Green River Indians, related to their territory.) - They lived in the central Green River Valley, mostly above the former confluence near present-day Auburn. The term skop means "first big and then little," in apparent reference to fluctuations of the Green River. Another source says their name is derived from the village name ill-AHL-koh ("confluence" or "striped water") at the historic confluence of the White and Green rivers at the present-day town of Auburn, possibly from the striped appearance of the Green River below the confluence before the waters merged.
 Tkwakwamish / T'Qua-qua-mish (along the headwaters of the Puyallup River)
 Yilalkoamish tribe
 Dothliuk (they lived in the area of South Prairie, Washington, south of the mouth of Wilkeson Creek at its confluence with South Prairie Creek, a Carbon River tributary)

Demographics 
Traditionally, the ancestors of the Muckleshoot lived along the eastern shores of Washington State's Puget Sound region and the adjacent rivers of the Cascade Range. They spoke Whulshootseed, a local form of Lushootseed. Most Muckleshoot today do not speak their ancestral language, but some do. The tribe has an active program for its preservation and resuscitation.

Most Muckleshoot now live on or near the 15.871 km2 (6.128 sq mi) Muckleshoot Reservation. They have an approximate population of more than 3,000, making the Muckleshoot one of the largest Native American tribes in Washington State. The 2000 census reported a resident population of 3,606 on reservation land, with 28.65 percent reported solely Native American heritage. The Coast Salish and Muckleshoot had long absorbed other peoples into their tribes and have had multi-racial descendants. Their children are raised culturally as Muckleshoot.

The reservation is located on Muckleshoot Prairie, between the White and Green rivers southeast of the city of Auburn (at ) in King and Pierce counties.  The city of Auburn overlaps and extends within the reservation. Some 72.6 percent of the reservation's population lives within the city boundaries.

Traditional culture 

Although they were skilled hunters, salmon fishing was the mainstay of traditional Coast Salish life. The people gathered and cured salmon, sometimes trading it with other peoples along the coast and inland. Because it was central to survival, salmon was treated with reverence, which continues to this day.

In the elaborate First Salmon Ceremony, which is still observed, the entire community shares the flesh of a Spring Chinook. They return its remains to the river where it was caught. This is so the salmon can inform the other fish of how well it was received. The other ceremony for the first salmon is to roast it until it becomes ashes. The Muckleshoot toss the bones and ashes back into the water or stream where they took the salmon, believing that the fish would come alive again (be part of a round of new propagation).

With a seemingly endless supply of food, the people could engage in various crafts, including weaving, wood-carving, and basket-making. A complex social structure also emerged, consisting of a nobility, middle class, and slaves. The latter were generally captured members of other tribes taken in raids or warfare.

Colonial contact 
Coast Salish life changed radically as a result of first encounters with European and American traders and explorers. Lacking immunity to the newcomers' infectious diseases, the native population became decimated by the mid-nineteenth century. At the same time, amicable relations with American settlers deteriorated as whites began claiming choice land for themselves and encroaching on Salish territory. They tried to prevent the Native Americans from hunting and fishing in their traditional territories. In a last-ditch attempt to stem the tide of white colonization, the Muckleshoot allied with other local peoples in the Puget Sound Indian War (1855–1856). Upon their defeat, they were forced under a Treaty into a tiny reservation near present-day Auburn, Washington.

20th century to present 
The peoples on the Muckleshoot Reservation cooperated and began to build a common culture. In the 1930s, they organized to set up a constitutional, elected government, adopting their constitution in 1936. They established more self-government, under an elected Tribal Council.

Tensions with whites and mainstream society abated only slightly, however. In the early 20th century, many ethnic Japanese established farms in the Green River Valley, cultivating the fertile land for agriculture. From fear and racial discrimination, the government ordered ethnic Japanese to be interned and transported out of the area to camps inland during the war. Many lost their houses, businesses, and property. After litigation and court challenges in the late 20th century, the US government formally apologized to their representatives, passing a law to pay compensation to survivors and descendants.

A large Army quartermaster depot was established in the Green River Valley at the south end of Auburn to take advantage of railways. It served the ports along Puget Sound, supporting the US war effort in the Pacific. In the post-World War II era, Auburn began to be more industrialized. Together with rapid population growth in the region, which developed many suburbs, these changes put pressure on the Muckleshoot and their reservation holdings. Many private land owners tried to prevent them from fishing and hunting in traditional territories.

In the 1960s and 1970s, the Muckleshoot engaged in a series of protests, intended at protecting their fragile ecosystem. Known as the Fish Wars, these protests attempted to preserve Muckleshoot fishing rights in nearby rivers that were not within the official reservation. County and state authorities had tried to regulate their fishing off-reservation. Similarly, the state tried to regulate other tribes in their fishing along the coastal waters.

In the Boldt Decision, the federal district court upheld the right of the Muckleshoot and other Treaty peoples to fish from the rivers of the region and hunt in these territories. It ruled that the Native Americans had rights to half the catch in their traditional areas. It designated the Muckleshoot as co-managers of the King County watershed, with control over fishing and hunting in their "Usual and Accustomed" historical fishing and hunting grounds.

While this improved the tribe's economic standing, the Muckleshoot were soon forced to contend with a sharp decline in the salmon population, due to the adverse effects on the environment, especially river water quality, of urbanization and industrialization. Dams on rivers had decreased the fish populations that could get upstream to spawn, and water quality in the rivers had declined. While they continue to fight for the preservation of the ancient salmon runs, the Muckleshoot also found other venues to improve their economy.

Taking advantage of their proximity to Seattle and other urban centers, and changes in gaming laws, in the late 20th century they opened a casino and bingo parlor on their reservation, called Muckleshoot Indian Casino and Muckleshoot Bingo. They have used some of the revenues to reacquire lands near the reservation and to support welfare and education of their people.

On February 22, 2023, the Seattle Kraken has announced their partnership with the tribe as their inaugural jersey sponsor starting in the beginning of the 2023-24 NHL season.

Government
The Muckleshoot organized under the Indian Reorganization Act of 1934, during the administration of President Franklin D. Roosevelt. They adopted a constitution that year that was ratified in 1941, establishing an elected government. The Muckleshoot Tribal Council has nine elected members to represent the tribe. This council is subject, in turn, to the General Council, consisting of all members of the tribe.

On November 6, 2013, the Muckleshoot Tribe bought 150 square miles (390 km2) of forest in Washington state to add to its landholdings.

Police
The reservation falls under Public Law 280 jurisdiction, with police services supplied by both King County and Auburn. The Muckleshoot Indian Tribe contracts with the King County Sheriff's Office for police services. As an unincorporated jurisdiction, the Tribe already receives base-level police services from the King County Sheriff's Office. Deputies assigned to the Muckleshoot reservation include six patrol officers, one school resource officer, a storefront deputy, a Muckleshoot Housing Authority deputy and one police chief assigned full-time to the reservation.

Education
Muckleshoot Tribal Schools is in King County, near Auburn. A modern, K-12 school opened in 2009, providing access to academic and cultural learning as well as 21st century technology.

References

Further reading

External links
Muckleshoot Tribe website
Muckleshoot Casino

Native American tribes in Washington (state)
Geography of King County, Washington
Geography of Pierce County, Washington
Federally recognized tribes in the United States